The NER Class R1 (LNER Class D21) was a class of 4-4-0 steam locomotives of the North Eastern Railway. The class was designed by Wilson Worsdell and built from 1908 to 1909.

Design
The design was similar to that of the NER Class R (LNER Class D20) but a larger boiler was used. Boiler pressure was initially .

Towards the end of construction the work was to be moved from Gateshead to Darlington Works. However the initial locomotive assembled as Darlington was failed as unfit to drive and subsequent investigations established that the coupling rod centres were not equal, resuling in a change of Works Manager at Darlington.

Modifications
Boiler pressure was reduced to 180 psi (1.24 MPa) at an unknown date. It was standard NER practice to reduce boiler pressure when fitting a superheater.

Use
The R1s were initially used on the Glasgow-Newcastle and York-Newcastle services. However, as loads increased, they were replaced by more powerful locomotive types (like the class Z) and relegated to secondary duties. By 1924, the Gresley A1s started to arrived in large numbers, which displaced the C7s to many of the secondary duties of the D21s, and in particular, York its entire allocation.

Withdrawal
They were withdrawn between 1942 and 1946 and none were preserved.

In fiction 
Although Edward the Blue Engine, from the Railway Series books and it's spin-off television series Thomas the Tank Engine & Friends, is regularly described as bearing "a quite striking similarity" to the Furness Railway 'Larger Seagulls'. Edward is recognisable as an NER Class R1. The Edwardian 4-4-0 type is a fairly common design pattern in British steam locomotives, although at the time of the Seagulls they still had low-set small diameter boilers with tall chimneys. Edward, in particular, differs in having a cab with dual glazed side windows, a much more characteristic feature of North Eastern railway locomotives, the tapered non-circular spectacle plate windows and also the larger boiler diameter and higher boiler line are distinctively those of the NER R1, by then the LNER D21.

References

R1
4-4-0 locomotives
Railway locomotives introduced in 1908
Scrapped locomotives
Standard gauge steam locomotives of Great Britain
Passenger locomotives